The FIS Ski Flying World Championships 1977 took place in Vikersund, Norway on 18 February 1977. Switzerland's Walter Steiner became the first-two-time winner of the championships.

Individual

Medal table

References
 FIS Ski flying World Championships 1977 results. - accessed 25 November 2009.

FIS Ski Flying World Championships
1977 in ski jumping
1977 in Norwegian sport
Ski jumping competitions in Norway
Modum
International sports competitions hosted by Norway
February 1977 sports events in Europe